DExH-box helicase 29 (DHX29) is a 155 kDa protein that in humans is encoded by the DHX29 gene.

Function 

This gene encodes a member of the DEAH (Asp-Glu-Ala-His) subfamily of proteins, part of the DEAD (Asp-Glu-Ala-Asp) box family of RNA helicases. The encoded protein functions in translation initiation, and is specifically required for ribosomal scanning across stable mRNA secondary structures during initiation codon selection. This protein may also play a role in sensing virally derived cytosolic nucleic acids. Knockdown of this gene results in reduced protein translation and impaired proliferation of cancer cells.

Interactions 

DHX29 has been shown to interact with the eukaryotic small ribosomal subunit (40S) and eIF3.

See also 
Eukaryotic translation
DExD/H box proteins
Ded1/DDX3

References

Further reading